Let the Sun Shine Again (German: Lass die Sonne wieder scheinen) is a 1955 Austrian-West German musical comedy film directed by Hubert Marischka and starring Hans Holt, Hertha Feiler and Cornelia Froboess. Shooting took place in the Triglav studios in Ljubljana and on location at the resorts of Opatija and Portorož on the Adriatic. The film's sets were designed by the art director Mirko Lipuzic.

Cast
 Hans Holt as 	Herbert Werner
 Hertha Feiler as Mira
 Cornelia Froboess as Angelika
 Hans Leibelt as 	Dr. Retlinger
 Erich Scholz as Georg
 Claire Reigbert as 	Frau Bröselmaier
 Walter Holten as Rechtsanwalt
 Alice Graf as Friedel Clausen
 Robert Lembke as Quizmaster
 Stane Sever as Teacher

References

Bibliography 
 Bock, Hans-Michael & Bergfelder, Tim. The Concise Cinegraph: Encyclopaedia of German Cinema. Berghahn Books, 2009.
 Fritsche, Maria. Homemade Men in Postwar Austrian Cinema: Nationhood, Genre and Masculinity. Berghahn Books, 2013.
 Von Dassanowsky, Robert. Austrian Cinema: A History. McFarland, 2005.
 Wagnleitner, Reinhold. Coca-Colonization and the Cold War: The Cultural Mission of the United States in Austria After the Second World War. Univ of North Carolina Press, 2000.

External links 
 

1955 films
1955 comedy films
Austrian comedy films
German comedy films
West German films
1950s German-language films
Films directed by Hubert Marischka
Austrian black-and-white films
German black-and-white films
Films set in Hamburg
Films shot in Croatia
1950s German films